Fujiwara no Kinshi (藤原 忻子; 1134 – September 12, 1209) was an Empress consort of Japan. She was the consort of Emperor Go-Shirakawa of Japan. 

She was born as the daughter of Tokudaiji Kinyoshi. She entered the Imperial Court and became a lady-in-waiting in 1155. She was made empress consort of Emperor Go-Shirakawa in 1156. Emperor Go-Shirakawa abdicated 2 years later. She was made empress dowager in 1172 and died at the age of 76 in 1209.

Notes

Fujiwara clan
Japanese empresses
Tokudaiji family
1134 births
1209 deaths